The 2005–06 season was the 109th season of competitive football by Heart of Midlothian, and their 23rd consecutive season in the top level of Scottish football, competing in the Scottish Premier League. Hearts also competed in the Scottish Cup and Scottish League Cup.

Season Overview
Romanov said that his ultimate aim is for Hearts to win the Champions League. His early actions included bringing in former Rugby Union chief Phil Anderton as CEO on 3 March 2005. On 9 May 2005, manager John Robertson resigned, a move which was greeted with much dismay among supporters because Robertson had been a great player for Hearts. Former Ipswich Town and Derby County manager George Burley was hired on 30 June 2005 to replace him.

As the season began, the combination of Romanov's financial backing and the appointment of Burley led many Hearts fans to believe that they could win the SPL championship in 2005–06. Signings such as Edgaras Jankauskas, Rudi Skácel and Takis Fyssas, allied to existing players Andy Webster, Steven Pressley, Craig Gordon, and Paul Hartley meant that Hearts built a team which made an outstanding start to the season. Hearts won their first eight SPL games, including a 1–0 win over reigning champions Rangers.

After leading the Jambos through ten undefeated SPL appearances, and guiding them to the top of the league table, Hearts and Burley parted ways on 22 October 2005, just hours before their Premier League match with Dunfermline Athletic. A club statement after the game declared that the departure of Burley had been mutually agreed and that there were "irreconcilable differences" between Burley and the Hearts board. Throughout his short spell in charge rumours had persisted that the relationship between Burley and Romanov was uneasy. It had also been reported that Romanov had signed players without Burley's consent.

John McGlynn was put in temporary charge of the team following Burley's abrupt departure. Chief executive Phil Anderton was dismissed on 31 October 2005. The chairman, George Foulkes resigned in protest at Anderton's dismissal. Romanov's son, Roman Romanov, was appointed as chairman and acting chief executive.

Vladimir Romanov's concerns with the fairness of refereeing developed during this period. This started after Hearts made complaints after a match with Rangers in the 2004–05 season during which the referee Hugh Dallas controversially awarded a decisive penalty kick late in the match on the basis of advice from his linesman Andy Davis. There were also complaints after the dismissals of Craig Gordon against Falkirk, Edgaras Jankauskas against Hibs and Saulius Mikoliunas against Rangers. Romanov called for a replay of each of these matches, but this was refused and Romanov was rebuked by the SFA.

On 7 November, Graham Rix was appointed as head coach. Hearts' title ambitions suffered a major setback when they lost 3–2 to Celtic on 1 January 2006. On 7 February 2006, reports were made indicating that Rix had told players who were apparently disgruntled at being left out of the team before a match against Dundee United that Romanov himself was picking the team and was "pulling the strings". While it was well known that Rix was not in charge of player transfer policy, it had not previously been confirmed that he was not in charge of selecting the team either.

Part of the fallout from this match was that the agent of Andy Webster indicated that Webster would not extend his contract with Hearts, which was due to expire at the end of 2006–07 season. During April 2006, Vladimir Romanov put Andy Webster on the transfer list, claiming that he could not trust the player.

Graham Rix was sacked as Hearts manager on 22 March 2006 along with the club's Director of Football, Jim Duffy, who had only been appointed one month previously. Shortly afterwards, former FBK Kaunas coach Valdas Ivanauskas was appointed interim head coach of the first team until the end of the season.

Nonetheless, on 2 April 2006 Hearts eased into the Scottish Cup Final. A 1–0 win over Aberdeen on 3 May at Tynecastle guaranteed second place in the SPL behind Celtic and a place in the Champions League qualifying rounds for the following season. It also meant that Hearts were the first club to break the total dominance of the Scottish Premier League by the Old Firm since Motherwell in 1995. Hearts then won the Scottish Cup by beating Scottish Second Division side Gretna in a penalty shootout after the final had finished 1–1.

Matches

Pre-Season Friendlies

Scottish Premier League

League Cup

Scottish Cup

League table

See also
List of Heart of Midlothian F.C. seasons

References

External links 
 Official Club website
 Complete Statistical Record

Heart of Midlothian F.C. seasons
Heart of Midlothian